In enzymology, a RNA-3′-phosphate cyclase is an enzyme that catalyzes the chemical reaction

ATP + RNA 3'-terminal-phosphate  AMP + diphosphate + RNA terminal-2',3'-cyclic-phosphate

Thus, the two substrates of this enzyme are ATP and RNA 3'-terminal-phosphate, whereas its 3 products are AMP, diphosphate, and RNA terminal-2',3'-cyclic-phosphate.

This enzyme belongs to the family of ligases, specifically those forming phosphoric-ester bonds.  The systematic name of this enzyme class is RNA-3'-phosphate:RNA ligase (cyclizing, AMP-forming). This enzyme is also called RNA cyclase.

Structural studies

References

Further reading 

 
 

EC 6.5.1
Enzymes of known structure